The women's high jump at the 2019 World Athletics Championships was held at the Khalifa International Stadium in Doha, Qatar, from 27 to 30 September 2019.

Summary
As might have been predictable, the six members of the female two metres club were the last six left in the competition at 2 metres. The newest member Karyna Demidik saved one attempt, but missed. First over was defending champion Mariya Lasitskene, who still had a clean round going. That was matched by Vashti Cunningham also maintaining a clean round. After two misses, returning silver medalist Yuliya Levchenko made it over. Returning bronze medalist Kamila Lićwinko was not so lucky and exited the competition. Next up newly tied U20 record holder Yaroslava Mahuchikh got over.

At 2.02m, Lasitskene continued her perfect series. Cunningham missed, and then Mahuchikh got over to set a new U20 record. Neither Levchenko or Cunningham could get over, leaving Cunningham with the bronze. At 2.04m, Lasitskene still remained perfect. After two misses, Mahuchikh got over again, setting a second new U20 record in the same competition; a 4 cm personal improvement. That was it, as Lasitskene had the advantage. Mahuchikh, with silver in her pocket, chose not to continue for a third personal best. Lasitskene took three failed attempts at 2.08m.

Records
Before the competition records were as follows:

Schedule
The event schedule, in local time (UTC+3), was as follows:

Results

Qualification
Qualification: 1.94 m (Q) or at least 12 best performers (q).

Final
The final was started on 30 September at 20:30.

References

High jump
High jump at the World Athletics Championships